Joshua Thompson (born May 9, 1993) is an American middle-distance runner who specializes in the 1500 metres. He runs professionally for the Bowerman Track Club.

In September 2019, Thompson won the 1500m at The Match Europe v USA in 3:38.88. He also won the 1500m at the 2019 ISTAF Berlin.

In February 2023, Thompson won the 1500m final at the at the USATF Indoor Championships at the Albuquerque Convention Center in New Mexico in a time of 3:42.31. However, he was disqualified after the race when officials, using a video review, determined that Thompson had impeded a competitor near the end of the race, resulting in Sam Prakel being declared the winner in 3:42.62.

References

1993 births
Living people
American male middle-distance runners
Oklahoma State Cowboys track and field athletes